La Chaussée-sur-Marne (literally La Chaussée on Marne) is a commune in the Marne department in the Grand Est region in north-eastern France. It is part of the canton of Vitry-le-François-Champagne et Der and the arrondissement of Vitry-le-François.

Geography and map
The altitude of the commune of La Chaussée-sur-Marne ranges between 87 and 187 meters. The area of the commune is 22.05 km2. The nearest larger town is Vitry-le-François, 13 km to the south.

Population and housing
The commune had a population of 778 in 2019. As of 2019, there are 349 dwellings in the commune, of which 322 primary residences.

See also
Communes of the Marne department

References

Chausseesurmarne